Tejgaon College,Dhaka is a college in Dhaka city, Bangladesh which was founded in 1961. It has 30,000 students. 

Tejgaon College is located at Farmgate, at the Dhaka city centre. It had started off as a night college in a school campus at Sadarghat. After successive moves to Tejgaon Industrial Area, Alia Madrasha (Bakshi Bazaar), Polytechnic School and Al-Razee Hospital Building, it is now located at Indira Road, Farmgate, Dhaka.

It is a university college since it now offers honours and master's courses on 25 to 27 subjects under the National University.

History 

The History of Tejgaon College

Popularly known Tejgaon College was primarily founded as Dhaka Night College in the year 1961 in the campus of Islamia High School beside the river Buriganga. The college was framed under the true & sincere effort made by Late Maulana Abul Khair. That time the name of the founder president of the college was the then education minister Mr. Shafiqul Islam,Advocate Bahauddin Ahmed & Advocate Mr. Abul Hossain were included as the members.During their tenure, the teachers used to teach the students with a scarce amount of remuneration, it was just 50 Tk. per month.

Many days were passed in the premises of Islamia High School. Then the education minister Mofizuddin shifted its campus in Madrasha-E-Alia in Dhaka. That continued for another one year & a half. Again the then authority had to look for a new address as a consequence of an untoward/unwanted incidence. That time they could manage to find its address in Tejgaon Polytechnic High School where its Headmaster, Mr. Noor Mohammad played a significant role. That time Mr. M.Q. Roisuddin performed his role as principal & his tenure was from 1963 to 1966. Because of facing various adversities, the authority had to go for a change of its campus from Tejgaon Polytechnic High School to the Crown Laundry, owned by Mr. Asadul Hoque, situated in Tejgaon industrial area. Surprisingly enough, the whole administration of the college again shifted its campus to the crossing road in Farmgate, which is presently known as Al-Razi Hospital. Along with that process, the college was renamed as “Tejgaon College” from its original one “Dhaka Night College”.

But unfortunately enough the college was yet to get its permanent compound. After the liberation war in 1971, the then prime minister & father of the nation, Bangabandhu Sheikh Muzibur Rahman chalked out a plan so that he could fulfill the long cherished desire of its huge number of students & the guardians by offering a permanent address. Finally Tejgaon College could manage to overcome its painful existence of being a parasite. All the teachers, staffs & the students contributed their joint effort to build up its new infrastructures. The number of the students kept on increasing & same as the case with the teachers. But the development history of Tejgaon College got its momentum when the  Principal Md. Abdur Rashid took over the charge in 1998 soon after the retirement of its former principal Tofail Ahmed Chowdhury. It may be mentioned here that it was Dr. Iqbal, the then president of the governing body & MP (Dhaka 10) also provided his all out effort support, guidance, inspiration & co-operation.

Off course some unpleasant happenings paused its course of development for the time being but with the blessings of almighty, the development index again succeeded to find its original track & undoubtedly now it is getting higher & higher & probably at its peak with dynamic, foresighted & determined leadership of Principal Md. Abdur Rashid along with the wise, timely, proper & ceaseless guidance by Honourable home minister Md. Asaduzzaman Khan Kamal mp,  the former chairman of the governing body and present Chairman of governing body Dr. Bhishawjit Ghosh  With this proceeding, Tejgaon College is crossing its yet another milestone by launching BBA,CSE,TMS & THM program .We are committed to build our student in accordance with the prevailing demand of the world. Studies in Business & IT in the sphere of the higher education can play the key role in meeting the demand of efficient human resource in business arena. Present Principal prof.Dr.Md. Harun-or-Rashid committed to continue the development of Tejgaon College.

Departments

Professional Honours Courses
CSE (Computer Science & Engineering)
BBA (Bachelor of Business Administration)
Theater & Media Studies
Tourism & Hospitality Management

Master's courses 

 Accounting
 Biochemistry
 Chemistry
 Economics
 English
 Finance and Banking
 Geography
 Islamic Studies
 Management
 Marketing
 Mathematics
 Political Science
 Psychology
 Social Work
 Sociology

Co-curricular activities
Tejgaon College has several organizations for co-curricular activity.

 Rover Scout Group
TCCELL
 Debate Club
 Satyan Bose Science Club
 Sangeet Club
 BNCC (Bangladesh National Cadet Corps)

References

External links
 Official website

Colleges affiliated to National University, Bangladesh
Private colleges in Bangladesh
Universities and colleges in Dhaka
Tejgaon College
1961 establishments in East Pakistan